NK Mosor, also known as HBDNK "Mosor – Sveti Jure", is a Croatian football club from Žrnovnica, settlement which is part of the city of Split on the Croatian coast.

The club was founded in 1928. It existed until World War II when most of its members enlisted in the army. When the war ended, the club had experienced such a high rate of fatalities that it was disbanded. In 1964 a team was once again formed. Since the 1990s the club has spent most of its time in the second division, never gaining promotion to the first league.

Honours

Treća HNL – South
Winners (3): 1998–99, 2002–03, 2003–04

Recent seasons

Key

Top scorer shown in bold when he was also top scorer for the division.

P = Played
W = Games won
D = Games drawn
L = Games lost
F = Goals for
A = Goals against
Pts = Points
Pos = Final position

1. HNL = Prva HNL
2. HNL = Druga HNL
3. HNL = Treća HNL

PR = Preliminary round
R1 = Round 1
R2 = Round 2
QF = Quarter-finals
SF = Semi-finals
RU = Runners-up
W  = Winners

External links
Official website 
NK Mosor at Nogometni magazin 

 
Association football clubs established in 1928
Football clubs in Croatia
Football clubs in Split-Dalmatia County
1928 establishments in Croatia